Thierry Lincou (born 2 April 1976, in La Réunion) is a retired professional squash player from France. He reached the World No. 1 ranking in January 2004. That year, Lincou won the World Open title, the Hong Kong Open and the Super Series Finals. He has been known as one of the greatest lateral movers in the game, as well as being one of the fittest players in the history of squash. His nickname, "titi", was founded by a former competitor, Amr Shabana. He called Thierry "titi-tight," because of his precision and tight shots.

Career overview
Lincou has enjoyed considerable success at the elite level of the game, rising steadily through the ranks since joining the professional squash circuit in 1994. He has beaten all of the world's top squash players including Peter Nicol, Jonathon Power, David Palmer, Lee Beachill, and many others. Lincou has been one of the most consistent players on the circuit – reaching the semi-finals of nine successive PSA events in 2003, and holding the World No. 1 ranking throughout 2005.

In 2003, Lincou was a member of the French team which finished runners-up to Australia at the World Team Squash Championships.

In 2004, he reached the PSA World Ranking Number 1 and became the first Frenchman to top the world rankings. In December, he won the 2004 World Open Squash Championship in Doha in Qatar against Lee Beachill 5–11, 11–2, 2–11, 12–10, 11–8. He became the first Frenchman to win the World Championship. In the same year, he won the Hong Kong Open against Nick Matthew in the final.

In 2006, he won 4 PSA World Tour titles including the Canary Wharf Squash Classic in London and the prestigious Pakistan Open in Islamabad.

He was runner-up of the prestigious British Open in 2006 against Nick Matthew and in 2007 against Grégory Gaultier.

He won 11 titles of the French Nationals and was one of only five players to have maintained themselves in the top 10 without interruption for 10 years at the PSA World Tour.

In October 2012, Thierry retired at the age of 36 after win the Bluenose Squash Classic, the 23rd PSA World Tour title of his career.

He is currently coaching the Massachusetts Institute of Technology varsity squash team.

World Open final appearances

1 title & 1 runner-up

Major World Series final appearances

British Open: 2 finals (0 titles, 2 runner-up)

Hong Kong Open: 2 finals (1 title, 1 runner-up)

Pakistan International: 2 finals (2 titles, 0 runner-up)

Career statistics

Singles performance timeline (since 1999) 

To prevent confusion and double counting, information in this table is updated only once a tournament or the player's participation in the tournament has concluded.

Note: NA = Not Available

See also
 Official Men's Squash World Ranking

References

External links 
 
 
 The Official Thierry Lincou website
 Page at Squashpics.com
 Article at Squashtalk.com (October 2001)

1976 births
Living people
French male squash players
People from Réunion
World Games silver medalists
Competitors at the 2005 World Games
College squash coaches in the United States